Khezerlu (also Romanized as Kheẕerlū, Khezerlū, and Khezrlu) is a village in Khezerlu Rural District of the Central District of Ajab Shir County, East Azerbaijan province, Iran. At the 2006 census, its population was 3,746 in 848 households. The following census in 2011 counted 3,575 people in 1,067 households. The latest census in 2016 showed a population of 3,505 people in 1,115 households; it was the largest village in its rural district.

References 

Ajab Shir County

Populated places in East Azerbaijan Province

Populated places in Ajab Shir County